Annemarie Düringer (26 November 1925 – 26 November 2014) was a Swiss actress. She was born in Arlesheim, Basel-Landschaft.

The daughter of a Swiss industrialist, she graduated from Cours Simon, Paris in 1946, and from the Max Reinhardt Seminar in Vienna the following year, in 1947. In 1949 she became a member of the prestigious Vienna Burgtheater where she played major roles such as Queen Elisabeth in Schiller's Maria Stuart. She remained in the ensemble of this theatre until her death. In 2004 she became patron of the Murau festival Shakespeare in Styria founded by Nicholas Allen and Rudolph J. Wojta.

She received numerous awards, including the Decoration for Services to the Republic of Austria. She died on her 89th birthday in Baden bei Wien, Lower Austria.

Filmography

Honours and awards

 National Film Award for "Night, when the Devil came" (Best Supporting Actress, 1958)
 Actress nomination for chamber (1963)
 Hans-Reinhart-Ring (1974)
 Kainz Medal (1977)
 Austrian Cross of Honour for Science and Art, 1st class (1977)
 Grand Decoration of Honour for Services to the Republic of Austria (1985)
 Honorary Gold Medal of Vienna
 Alma-Seidler-Ring (2000)
 Doyenne of the Burgtheater (2001)
 Gold Medal of Honour for Services to the City of Vienna (2005)

References

External links

Biography with portrait (in German)

1925 births
2014 deaths
Swiss stage actresses
Swiss film actresses
Swiss television actresses
20th-century Swiss actresses
21st-century Swiss actresses
People from Basel-Landschaft
Recipients of the Grand Decoration for Services to the Republic of Austria
Recipients of the Austrian Cross of Honour for Science and Art, 1st class
German Film Award winners